Erythrolamprus viridis, the crown ground snake, is a species of snake in the family Colubridae. The species is found in Brazil.

References

Erythrolamprus
Reptiles of Brazil
Endemic fauna of Brazil
Reptiles described in 1862
Taxa named by Albert Günther